Vojtěch Dyk (born 23 July 1985, in Prague) is a Czech actor and singer. The son of the literary critic Radko Pytlík, as a singer he is known for being frontman of musical groups Nightwork and Tros Discotequos.

Selected filmography

Films 
 Ženy v pokušení (2010) 
 Micimutr (2011)
 Revival (2013) 
 Tři bratři (2014) 
 Anděl Páně 2 (2016) 
 Na střeše (2019)
 Il Boemo (2022)

TV series 
 Letiště (2006 - 2007)
 Velmi křehké vztahy (2007)
 Panelák (2008)
 Ďáblova lest (2009)
 Dokonalý svět (2010)
 Terapie (2019)

Discography

Studio albums
Vojta Dyk a B-Side Band (2014)
D.Y.K. (2019)

Awards

References

External links
Official website

1985 births
Living people
21st-century Czech male singers
21st-century Czech male actors
Czech male stage actors
Czech male film actors
Czech male television actors
Academy of Performing Arts in Prague alumni
People from Prague
Recipients of the Thalia Award